Robert I. Field is a professor at Drexel University Kline School of Law.

Field received his undergraduate degree from Harvard College, Juris Doctor degree from Columbia Law School, master's in public health from the Harvard School of Public Health, and doctorate in psychology from Boston University.

He has worked in private law firms, an academic medical center, and policy research centers, including the Institute of Medicine.

References

External links
 Robert Field's Health Care Regulation in America Website

Living people
Year of birth missing (living people)
Harvard School of Public Health alumni
Columbia Law School alumni
Boston University alumni
University of Pennsylvania faculty
University of the Sciences faculty
Harvard College alumni